Dementyevskaya is a rural locality (a village) in Spasskoye Rural Settlement, Tarnogsky District, Vologda Oblast, Russia. The population was 35 as of 2002.

Geography 
Dementyevskaya is located 29 km northwest of Tarnogsky Gorodok (the district's administrative centre) by road. Grigoryevskaya is the nearest rural locality.

References 

Rural localities in Tarnogsky District